State Route 226 (SR 226) is a primary state highway in the U.S. state of Virginia. Known as Cox Road, the state highway runs  from U.S. Route 460 (US 460) near Sutherland east to US 1 and US 460 Business near Petersburg. SR 226 is the old alignment of US 460 in northeastern Dinwiddie County.

Route description

SR 226 begins at an intersection with US 460 east of Sutherland; the U.S. Highway heads west as Cox Road and southeast as Airport Street, which serves Dinwiddie County Airport on its way to junction with Interstate 85 and US 1. The state highway heads east as a two-lane undivided road that crosses over Norfolk Southern Railway's Norfolk District rail line. SR 226's surroundings gradually transition from farmland to suburban residential subdivisions and commercial strips. The state highway reaches its eastern terminus at US 1 and US 460 Business (Boydton Plank Road) a short distance west of the independent city of Petersburg.

Major intersections

References

External links

Virginia Highways Project: VA 226

226
State Route 226